John Hambley is a British television and film producer. He was executive producer for television series such as Minder, The Wind in the Willows, Danger Mouse and Count Duckula. He also produced the film The BFG, a movie for which he wrote the script.

External links

Year of birth missing (living people)
British film producers
British television producers
Living people